Stamp Brooksbank (23 June 1694 – 24 May 1756) was an English MP and Governor of the Bank of England.

He was the eldest son of warehouseman and haberdasher Joseph Brooksbank of Hackney House and Cateaton St., Cheapside, London. He was the heir of his mother's father Richard Stamp, the elder brother of Sir Thomas Stamp, Lord Mayor of London in 1692. He became a successful merchant trading with Turkey and was a member of the New England Company in 1726. He succeeded his father in 1726 to Healaugh Manor, near Tadcaster, Yorkshire.

He was elected MP for Colchester in 1727 and for Saltash in 1743, being re-elected for the same constituency in 1747. He was a director of the Bank of England from 1728 to 1740 and from 1743 to 1755, as deputy governor from 1740 to 1741 and as governor from 1741 to 1743.

He built Hackney House in Clapton in 1732. He had married Elizabeth, the daughter of Joseph Thomson of Hackney and Nonsuch Park, Surrey with whom he had 3 sons and 5 daughters. He was succeeded by his son Joseph.

References

 

1694 births
1756 deaths
People from the City of London
Members of the Parliament of Great Britain for constituencies in Cornwall
British MPs 1727–1734
British MPs 1741–1747
British MPs 1747–1754
Deputy Governors of the Bank of England
Governors of the Bank of England
Stamp